The Sumatran cochoa (Cochoa beccarii) is a species of bird in the family Turdidae. It is endemic to Indonesia. Its natural habitat is subtropical or tropical moist montane forests. It is threatened by habitat loss.

References

Sumatran cochoa
Birds of Sumatra
Sumatran cochoa
Taxonomy articles created by Polbot